Mosese Vosanibola, spelt also as Mosese Vosanibole (born 28 July 1962 in Nabua) is a Fijian rugby union player. He plays as scrum-half. He is nicknamed Moses and Jack Dolly.

Career
Vosanibola played for Nabua during his club career.
He played for Fiji B in the match against England national rugby union team on 1990, in Lautoka, where England was defeated 28-12, where in the 47th minute, with Vosanibola, Ifereimi Tawake and Pio Kubuvai, a try was scored by Waisale Serevi and one try scored by Vosanibola towards the end of the match, ended with a 19-13 victory for the Fijian side.
Vosanibola had only two caps for the Fiji national team in 1991, the former against Tonga, at Suva on 11 June and the latter against France, in Grenoble, during the 1991 Rugby World Cup, which was his last international cap.

Personal life
His son, Joni Vosanibola is also a rugby union player. 

He is currently the executive committee and coaching panelist  of the Nabua Rugby Club after retiring from his military career that span more than 30 years

Notes

External links

Fiji international rugby union players
Fijian rugby union players
Rugby union scrum-halves
1962 births
Living people
I-Taukei Fijian people